Michael Robert Gilbertson (born 18 August 1961) is the current Archdeacon of Chester.

Early life and education
Born in Stockport on 18 August 1961, he was educated at Stockport Grammar School and New College, Oxford.

After a career in the Civil Service he trained for the Anglican ministry at Cranmer Hall, Durham.

He lives in Huntington, Chester with his wife Jenny. They have two adult children.

Ordained ministry
He was ordained in 1997. He was a curate at St Matthew's, Surbiton then Vicar of All Saints, Stranton, Hartlepool before his appointment as archdeacon in May 2010.

References

1961 births
Alumni of New College, Oxford
People educated at Stockport Grammar School
Archdeacons of Chester
Living people
Alumni of Cranmer Hall, Durham